Pere Tàpias (19 May 1946 – 22 April 2017) was a singer and a food writer in Catalonia, Spain. He resided in Vilanova i la Geltrú at the time of his death in April 2017.  He was the host of the Catalunya Ràdio program, Tàpies Variades.  He was the 2005–2006 Ambassor of Xató.

Publications 
Cuines de Vilanova:  Xató, all cremat, ranxo, sípia a la bruta, arrossos. Col·lecció El Cullerot

References

1946 births
2017 deaths
Radio personalities from Catalonia
Food writers from Catalonia